HAF may refer to:
Halfling, via Dungeons and Dragons
 the Haftar Armed Forces, the United Nations term for the Libyan National Army, a group of armed forces in Libya opposed to the Government of National Accord roughly from 2016–present
 Haiphong Sign Language
 Half Moon Bay Airport, in San Mateo County, California, United States
 Headquarters, United States Air Force
 Heathrow Terminal 4 railway station, in London
 Hellenic Air Force
 Helms Athletic Foundation
 Heydar Aliyev Foundation
 Hindu American Foundation
 Homeworkers' Union, a former trade union in Denmark
 Honduran Air Force